Afternoon prayer may refer to:

 Asr, the daily Islamic prayer offered in the late afternoon
 Dhuhr, the daily Islamic afternoon prayer (offered earlier than Asr)
 Mincha, the daily Jewish afternoon prayer
 Tzidkatcha, the weekly Jewish afternoon prayer (recited on Shabbat)
 None (liturgy), the daily Christian afternoon prayer